Nittur is a village located in Hosanagara Taluk, Shimoga District, Karnataka, India. The village is located in dense forest, on the Shimoga-Kollur state highway. Kodachadri peak falls within the jurisdiction of Nittur Grama Panchayat.

Agriculture
The primary activity of villagers in and around Nittur is agriculture, with the majority of attention going to farming areca nuts.

Kodachadri peak 
Nittur is a starting point for one of the trekking routes to Kodachadri peak, which is located at about 15 km from the village.

References

Villages in Shimoga district